Natalie M. Kalmus (née Dunfee, also documented as Dunphy; April 7, 1878November 15, 1965) was the executive head of the Technicolor art department and credited as the director or "color consultant" of all Technicolor films produced from 1934 to 1949.

Once an art student and model, she married American scientist and engineer Herbert T. Kalmus in 1902 and later co-founded with him the Technicolor Motion Picture Corporation, serving for two decades as the company's chief on-site representative at studios that rented Technicolor's cameras for filming their color productions. Natalie Kalmus, who is often credited as a co-developer of the Technicolor process itself, was a member of the production team that shot the first Technicolor footage in 1917. Kalmus held strong views about the balanced use of color in film composition and often clashed with directors, cinematographers, and studio set designers who in her view sought to overuse dramatic colors simply as random accents in scenes, too often, gratuitously or for theatrical effect.

"Ringmaster to the rainbow"
Kalmus collaborated with the art and wardrobe departments of motion-picture studios during the preparation and filming of Technicolor productions. She reviewed their costume selections, set furnishings, and lighting and then specified needed color changes and equipment adjustments to create the best visual "palette" for her company's Technicolor cameras. She and her staff also prepared color preference charts for each scene in a film. Kalmus by 1939, according to The New York Times, was earning $65,000 a year ($ today) as an executive for Technicolor. In summarizing her duties as the company's color art director at various studios, Kalmus described her role "'as playing ringmaster to the rainbow'". Those duties also required her to work closely with principal cast during production to establish the best visual environment and emotional atmosphere to support and even enhance the actors' performances. In 1932, Photoplay feature writer Lois Shirley described for her readers the mix of psychology and technical expertise that "color scientist" Kalmus employed to get a leading actress to select an appropriate item of clothing for the Technicolor cameras:

Kalmus's color chart, 1932
In addition to explaining to studio personnel the technical aspects of filming in Technicolor, Kalmus in her work analyzed and documented her observations regarding the psychological effects of color, more specifically how different colors emanate particular "vibrations" or varying levels of "radiations". When presented individually or in concert, those vibrations, according to Kalmus's extensive film experience, can evoke a predictable range of emotional responses from viewers. She, as a point of reference, composed charts with colors categorized and defined by their respective effects. Those charts provide some insight into her methodology in directing the use of the Technicolor cameras rented from her company. They also provide some understanding of her thinking in her discussions with set designers as well as in her consultations with actors, whether assisting them in choosing costumes in line with the scripted personalities of their characters or "encouraging" an actor's own "mental satisfaction" during dress rehearsals and while performing on camera. The following is a verbatim transcription of "The Significance of Color", one of the quick-reference charts "made by Natalie Kalmus" and published in the previously cited 1932 Photoplay article written by Lois Shirley:
Blacks and dark browns. Definitely depressive.
Gray. The lifting of sadness. A mixture of black and white. People who wear it are often in-between people.
Red. The strongest vibration of all. A stimulant. It is sex; it is life. Many emotional people cannot wear it, because it throws them into chaos. Slow, unemotional, unimaginative people seek it to arouse emotional energy.
Scarlet. The come-hither color. An exaggeration of red.
Blue. It represents peace, harmony and home and definitely refines and cools. Excellent for those working at high tension.
Green. Fresh green means life; springtime. It is both a sedative and a stimulant, depending on the person. And it is definitely the money-getting color; the indication of the ultra-ambitious; the intellect. Heavy, dull green is indicative of laziness and envy. Dull greens are splendid for the nervous, dynamic character but act almost as a sleeping potion to the slow-minded.
Pink. Youthful joyousness. Almost all young people should have pink rooms for soft radiations while character is forming. 
Purple. Royalty; dignity; glory. Always used in religious rites and to pay homage to royalty, church dignitaries, etc. However, it is ponderous and adds weight.
Orange. The color of physical strength. It tends to submerge all about it.
Yellow. The highest of all. The sun. Gaiety; joy; glory; power; great love. Always stimulating. Lemon yellow, however, is soothing.
Orchid [a rich, lighter tone of purple]. Indicative of spiritual affections and when carried to great lengths forms a barrier against love.

Criticism
Kalmus had both technical reasons and her color charts for insisting on the use of specific colors for costumes, props, and lighting during filming with Technicolor cameras. In her efforts to ensure that colors were properly registered and reproduced, she was often accused by studio personnel of going to the extreme in set composition, of insisting on too many neutral or muted colors in scenes. "A super-abundance of color is unnatural", she once observed, "and has a most unpleasant effect not only upon the eye itself, but upon the mind as well." She recommended "the judicious use of neutrals" as a "foil for color" to lend "power and interest to the touches of color in a scene." In March 1939, during the making of Gone with the Wind, producer David O. Selznick complained in a memo to the film's production manager:

While directing the Metro-Goldwyn-Mayer musical Meet Me in St. Louis (1944), Vincente Minnelli recalled his work with Kalmus: "My juxtaposition of color had been highly praised on the stage, but I couldn't do anything right in Mrs. Kalmus's eyes." That recalled experience suggests that Kalmus, unlike Minnelli, clearly viewed motion pictures and stage productions as having starkly different technical requirements with regard to color composition and presentation.

After Technicolor

Natalie Kalmus's association with Technicolor, Inc. ended in 1948 when she named the company as a co-defendant in her alimony suit against Herbert Kalmus. She sued unsuccessfully for separate maintenance, including half of her ex-husband's assets of the corporation. Two years later, embarking on a new line of business, she licensed her name for a line of designer television cabinets made by a California manufacturer. The correspondence and records relating to that and other business ventures, along with Kalmus's personal papers are preserved in the Margaret Herrick Library at the Academy of Motion Picture Arts and Sciences in Beverly Hills, California.

Personal life and death
Natalie married Herbert Kalmus on July 23, 1902 in Baldwinville, Massachusetts. She studied at the University of Zurich and Queen's University in Ontario where her husband  also taught physics, electro-chemistry and metallurgy and earned his doctorate.  The couple "secretly" divorced June 22, 1922, but they continued to live in "separate adjoining apartments" in Hollywood into the 1940s. Despite their divorce, Natalie and Herbert continued to work together for over two decades, with most of their friends completely unaware that their marriage had ended.

Natalie Kalmus died at Roslindale General Hospital in Boston, Massachusetts on November 15, 1965. She was interred in Beechwood Cemetery in the village of Centerville, Massachusetts, on Cape Cod.

References

Further reading
 Natalie Kalmus, "Color Consciousness," Journal of the Society of Motion Picture Engineers 25, August 1935, p. 135-47.
 Natalie Kalmus, "Colour," in Behind the Screen: How Films Are Made, Stephen Watts, ed. London: A. Barker, Ltd., 1938.
 "Madam Kalmus, Chemist," New York Times, April 2, 1939, p. 134.
 Natalie Kalmus, "Doorway to Another World," Coronet, vol. 25, no. 6, April 1949.
 Richard L. Coe, "Nation's Screens to Take on Color," Washington Post, March 7, 1950, p. 12.
 Scott Higgins, Harnessing the Technicolor Rainbow: Color Design in the 1930s. University of Texas Press, 2007. .

External links

Kalmus v. Kalmus, 1950.
Kalmus v. Kalmus, 1951.
Natalie Kalmus television sets.
Natalie Kalmus Collection, Margaret Herrick Library.

American media executives
1870s births
1965 deaths